The 2009 Open d'Orléans was a professional tennis tournament played on indoor hard courts. It was part of the 2009 ATP Challenger Tour. It took place in Orléans, France between 19 and 25 October 2009.

ATP entrants

Seeds

 Rankings are as of October 12, 2009.

Other entrants
The following players received wildcards into the singles main draw:
  Jérémy Chardy
  Nicolas Mahut
  Olivier Patience

The following players received a Special Exempt into the singles main draw:
  Alex Bogdanovic
  Dieter Kindlmann

The following players received entry from the qualifying draw:
  Rabie Chaki
  Stefano Galvani
  Jérôme Haehnel
  Matwé Middelkoop
  Vincent Millot (as a Lucky loser)

Champions

Singles

 Xavier Malisse def.  Stéphane Robert, 6–1, 6–2

Doubles

 Colin Fleming /  Ken Skupski def.  Sébastien Grosjean /  Olivier Patience, 6–1, 6–1

External links
Official website
ITF Search 
2009 Draws